Tournavista District is one of five districts of the province Puerto Inca in Peru.

References